Henry Immelman (born 26 May 1995) is a South African rugby union player, currently playing with Scottish URC side Edinburgh Rugby. He plays as a centre, wing or fullback.

Rugby career

2013–2016: Free State Cheetahs and CUT Ixias

He was born in Upington, but attended Grey College in Bloemfontein.

After school, he joined the Free State Cheetahs' academy, and he made seven starts for the  team in the 2014 Under-21 Provincial Championship, scoring 22 points.

He made four appearances for the Bloemfontein-based university side  in the 2015 Varsity Cup in a poor season that saw the team lose all seven of their matches.

He made a further six starts for CUT Ixias in the 2016 Varsity Cup, helping them to two victories and sixth place on the log. He was also included in the  squad that competed in the 2016 Currie Cup qualification series, but he failed to make any appearances in the competition.

2016–2021: Montpellier

Henry Immelman moved to France in July 2016 to join Top 14 side , signing a youth contract with the team. He made his debut for the senior team in their Round 6 match against , replacing Alexandre Dumoulin for the second half of the match.

2021-present: Edinburgh

In April 2021, it was announced that Immelman would move to Edinburgh Rugby ahead of the 2021/22 season (the first of the new United Rugby Championship to include 4 South African Teams). He played for the side in their pre-season friendly against Newcastle Falcons in September that year. -

References

External links
 Varsity Cup profile
 Scoresway profile
 It's Rugby profile

South African rugby union players
Montpellier Hérault Rugby players
Edinburgh Rugby players
Living people
1995 births
People from Upington
Rugby union fullbacks
Rugby union centres
Rugby union wings
Rugby union players from the Northern Cape